Wal is a brand of electric bass manufactured by Electric Wood Ltd, first in High Wycombe and later in Fetcham, Surrey, England. It was started in 1974 by guitar builder and electronics expert Ian Waller and luthier Pete Stevens. Since 2009 it has been run by Paul Herman.

History

Wal basses founder, Ian Waller, was a bass player in 1960s Manchester pop scene. In the late 1960s he moved to London to follow a career as an Electronics Engineer. However, he quickly became involved in the film and then music industry because of both his electronics and woodworking skills. He became known to a number of players on the London session scene for his guitar-making abilities, eventually being commissioned to build basses for them.

Early custom basses were purchased by leading bass players from the London studio circuit, such as John Gustafson (at the time of Roxy Music) and John G. Perry (formerly of Caravan) who commissioned the first instrument branded as a "Wal" bass. Another early commission was for a triple-necked bass, purchased by Rick Wakeman for his bassist, Roger Newell, to use in "The Myths and Legends of King Arthur and the Knights of the Round Table" concerts. The bass was later given to Chris Squire of Yes and is now on loan to the Hard Rock Cafe.

Later, a short run of semi-custom models (designated the JG series after the owner of one of the first models, John Gustafson) featured hand-tooled leather scratchplates. They introduced for the first time the distinctive eight coil humbucking pick-ups and proprietary bridge hardware which became a feature of all future Wal bass models. Owners of these models included John Entwistle, Paul Simonon, Gary Tibbs, Alan Spenner, and Percy Jones.

The first full production range of Wal basses appeared in 1978 as the "Pro Series". These basses followed the basic design specifications of the JG series (solid ash body, maple, hornbeam and Amazonian hardwood neck and rosewood fingerboard) but replaced the leather scratchplate with a large plastic one. The Pro series offered a range of electronics options – one or two pick-ups and passive or active wiring. The active models introduced switchable filters for each pick-up allowing certain frequencies to be cut and boosted to provide a wider range of tonal options. In addition they featured a "pick attack" feature which boosted a narrow band of upper-mid range frequencies to simulate the attacking tone of a pick when playing fingerstyle.

The Pro Series was superseded by the Custom Series in 1983. This introduced the laminated bodies now standard on Wal basses. Various woods such as American walnut, schedua, hydua, padauk and wenge were offered as standard facings over a mahogany core. During the 1980s the range was expanded to introduce 5-string and 6-string models and three distinct but similar body shapes were introduced. These are commonly referred to as Mark 1 (the original Custom 4-string style, developed from the shape of the JG and Pro Series), Mark 2 (introduced with the 5-string model this is a larger body but with a rounder profile at the bridge end of the body and a more asymmetric upper cutaway than the Mark 1). The Mark 3 body style was introduced with the introduction of the 6-string models in the early 1990s (these are essentially slimmer versions of the Mark 2 body style). Other rare models were also available periodically, including a MIDI-bass (the MB4 & MB5) and a simplified passive model.

The popularity of the brand grew through the 1980s leading to an expansion of the company, although it retained its custom builder ethos and approach. In this period Paul Herman, who would later take over control of the company, began his first period working for Wal. During this period the basses found wide usage among both UK session players and a number of "name" bass players, e. g. Paul McCartney, Bruce Thomas, Geddy Lee, John Illsley, Martin Kemp, Flea, Justin Chancellor, Mick Karn, Jose Villanueva and others.

Death of founder, restart
In 1988, Ian Waller died of a heart attack at age 43, after which Pete Stevens continued running the business. However, through the period post-2000 a series of circumstances led to a significant contraction in the company. This culminated in Stevens working as a sole trader with little or no additional workforce, causing the supply of Wal basses to become increasingly limited. Around 2005 Pete Stevens' failing health and a number of changes to the company's workshop premises caused him to fall badly behind on the company's order book. By the end of 2007, Stevens' increasing health problems forced him to retire, leaving the future of the brand in serious doubt.

However, on 20 August 2008, it was announced that business would resume under luthier Paul Herman, who had previously worked at Wal during the late 1980s and 1990s although production would move from High Wycombe to a workshop in Fetcham, Surrey. Herman cleared outstanding back-orders and on 5 October 2009, began inviting new orders again with the launch of a new Wal basses website.

On 28 December 2011, Pete Stevens died, shortly after his 65th birthday.

References

External links

 Wal company website
 A Wal history and information site
 A Wal Bass owner's site with images of a Wal Mk II bass and brochure
 A Wal owner's database (no longer updated)
 Wal dataBass (Revived from Stephan Koesters initiative)
 The blog of a Wal fan

Electric bass guitars by manufacturer
Bass guitars
1974 establishments in England
Goods manufactured in England